The 2023 Milan–San Remo was a road cycling one-day race that took place on 18 March 2023 in northwestern Italy. It was the 114th edition of the Milan–San Remo cycling classic.

Teams 
Twenty-five teams will participate in the race.

UCI WorldTeams

 
 
 
 
 
 
 
 
 
 
 
 
 
 
 
 
 
 

UCI ProTeams

Result

References

External links 
 

2023
Milan-San Remo
Milan-San Remo
Milan-San Remo